The 1957 Mitropa Cup was the 17th season of the Mitropa football club tournament. It was won by Vasas who beat Vojvodina in the two-legged final 5–2 on aggregate.

Quarter-finals
Matches played between 30 June and 11 July 1957.

|}

1 Rapid Wien beat MTK Budapest 4–1 in a play-off to qualify for the Semi-finals.2 Red Star beat Dukla Praha 1–0 in a play-off to qualify for the Semi-finals.

Semi-finals
Matches played between 14 and 20 July 1957.

|}

1 Rapid Wien withdrew from play-off and Vojvodina advanced to Final.

Final

|}

See also
1957–58 European Cup

External links
1957 Mitropa Cup at Rec.Sport.Soccer Statistics Foundation

1957
1957–58 in European football
1957–58 in Hungarian football
1957–58 in Yugoslav football
1957–58 in Austrian football
1957–58 in Czechoslovak football